Vacancy is the seventh studio album by American rock band Bayside released on August 19, 2016 through Hopeless Records.

Background
Vacancy was recorded in March and April 2016 in Nashville, Tennessee, with producer Tim O'Heir. He acted as engineer, with additional engineering from Arun Bali of Saves the Day. Chris Sheldon mixed the album, before it was mastered by Howie Weinberg.

Release
On April 26, 2016, Vacancy was announced for release in August. In addition, the album's artwork was revealed. On May 13, "Enemy Lines" was made available for streaming and the album's track listing was revealed. A music video was released for "Pretty Vacant" on June 9, directed by Justin Giritlian and Nathan Sam. Vacancy was released on August 19 through Hopeless Records. In August and September, the group went on a headlining tour of the US with support from the Menzingers and Sorority Noise. In April and May 2017, the group went on co-headlining US tour with Say Anything with support from Reggie and the Full Effect and Hot Rod Circuit. To promote the tour, Bayside covered Say Anything's "Night's Songs", while Say Anything covered Bayside's "They're Not Horses, They're Unicorns". In September, the band performed at Riot Fest.

Reception
The album received favorable reviews from fans and critics.

Metacritic gives the album a score of 72 based on six critics

Track listing 
All songs written by Anthony Raneri, Jack O'Shea, Nick Ghanbarian, and Chris Guglielmo, except "Mary" by Raneri, O'Shea, Ghanbarian, Guglielmo, and Chris Carrabba.

Personnel
Personnel per booklet.

Bayside
 Anthony Raneri – vocals, guitar
 Jack O'Shea – guitar
 Nick Ghanbarian – bass guitar
 Chris Guglielmo – drums

Additional musicians
 Rob Crowell – keys
 Steve Soboslai – additional programming

Production and design
 Tim O'Heir – producer, engineer
 Chris Sheldon – mixing
 Howie Weinberg – mastering
 Arun Bali – additional engineering
 Jason Link – album design
 Jani Zubkovs – cover photo
 Rowan Daly – additional photos
 Megan Thompson – band photos

Charts

References

External links

Vacancy at YouTube (streamed copy where licensed)

Bayside (band) albums
2016 albums
Hopeless Records albums